Across the Tracks is a 1991 American drama film about track and field directed and written by Sandy Tung. It stars Rick Schroder, Brad Pitt, Carrie Snodgress, and David Anthony Marshall.

Plot 
Joe Maloney (Brad Pitt) is a straight A student vying for an athletic scholarship to Stanford. He lives with his mother (Carrie Snodgress) in a trailer park in Gardena, CA. His well laid plans for the future are thrown into turmoil when his troubled younger brother Billy (Rick Schroder) is released from Juvenile Detention following his arrest for stealing a car and comes to live with them back home.

Cast
 Rick Schroder as Billy Maloney
 Brad Pitt as Joe Maloney
 Carrie Snodgress as Rosemary Maloney
 David Anthony Marshall as Louie
 Thomas Mikal Ford as Coach Walsh
 Annie Dylan as Linda
 Jack McGee as Frank
 Jaime P. Gomez as Bobby

External links
 
 
 

1991 films
1991 drama films
1991 independent films
American drama films
American independent films
American track and field films
1990s English-language films
Films scored by Joel Goldsmith
Films shot in Los Angeles
1990s American films